The Melges 24 is an American trailerable sailboat that was designed by Reichel/Pugh as a one-design racer and first built in 1993.

The design became an accepted World Sailing international class in 1997.

Production
The design has been built by Melges Performance Sailboats in the United States, starting in 1993, and remains in production. It also was produced at one time by Devoti Sailing in the Czech Republic. A total of 250 boats had been built by the end of 1994 and more than 900 boats had been completed by 2021.

Design
The Melges 24 is a racing keelboat, built predominantly of fiberglass. It has a fractional sloop rig with a deck-stepped carbon fiber mast. The hull has a nearly-plumb stem, an open reverse transom, a transom-hung rudder controlled by a carbon fiber tiller with an extension and a retractable lifting keel with a weighted bulb. It displaces  and carries  of lead ballast.

With the keel retracted it can operate in shallow water or be transported on a trailer.

The boat may be fitted with a small  outboard motor for docking and maneuvering. The motor is stored under the cockpit when not in use.

Typically the boat employs a crew of four sailors, but two to five crew may be carried.

Operational history
The boat is supported by an active class club that organizes racing events, the International Melges 24 Class Association.

The design is raced in over 20 countries on five continents and the class world championships typically attract over 100 boats.

In a 1996 review Darrell Nicholson wrote in Practical Sailor, "if sailboats were defined in human terms, the Melges 24 could easily be described as having the attributes of a precocious three-year-old who hadn't learned to respect her elders. More than likely, she also would be described as being gifted, if a little high strung ... Aside from its plumb bow, narrow beam, flat bottom, hard bilges and open transom, one of the most striking features of the boat's design is the enormous, 13-foot long cockpit, designed to allow crew to move quickly from side to side during tacks, and to position weight in pre-determined spots to maximize boat speed off the breeze."

Events

See also
List of sailing boat types

References

External links

Melges 24
Keelboats
1990s sailboat type designs
Sailing yachts
Trailer sailers
One-design sailing classes
Classes of World Sailing
Sailboat type designs by Reichel/Pugh
Sailboat types built by Melges Performance Sailboats
Sailboat types built by Devoti Sailing